Greg Cannom (born 1951) is an American special make-up effects artist. He is the recipient of several accolades, including five Academy Awards and two Saturn Awards, and has been nominated for four Primetime Emmy Awards and four BAFTA Awards.

Cannom is best known for his work on the films Hook (1991), Bram Stoker's Dracula (1992), Mrs. Doubtfire (1993), The Mask (1994), Titanic (1997), Bicentennial Man (1999), Hannibal (2001), The Passion of the Christ (2004), The Curious Case of Benjamin Button (2008) and Vice (2018). For his exceptional contributions, he was honored with an Academy Award for Technical Achievement in 2005 and a Lifetime Achievement Award given by the Make-Up Artists and Hair Stylists Guild in 2018.

Filmography
 Vice (2018) (age makeup: Christian Bale)
 Fan (2016) (age makeup: Shah Rukh Khan)
Kapoor and Sons (2016) (age makeup: Rishi Kapoor)
The Curious Case of Benjamin Button (2008) (age makeups creator and applicator)
Babel (2006) (age makeup: Brad Pitt) (uncredited)
Big Momma's House 2 (2006) (special makeup effects creator)
The Exorcism of Emily Rose (2005) (makeup effects consultant)
The Life and Death of Peter Sellers (2004) (special makeup effects artist)
Van Helsing (2004) (special makeup designer)
The Whole Ten Yards (2004) (age makeup artist: Kevin Pollak) (uncredited)
The Passion of the Christ (2004) (makeup effects consultant)
Master and Commander: The Far Side of the World (2003) (special makeup artist: Russell Crowe)
Pirates of the Caribbean: The Curse of the Black Pearl (2003) (special makeup effects artist)
Bulletproof Monk (2003) (prosthetic makeup artist) (special makeup effects artist)
The Singing Detective (2003) (special makeup effects artist)
A Beautiful Mind (2001) (special makeup designer)
Ali (2001) (special makeup effects artist)
America's Sweethearts (2001) (special makeup effects artist)
Monkeybone (2001) (special makeup effects)
Hannibal (2001) (special makeup designer)
Little Nicky (2000) (age makeup artist: Dana Carvey)
Big Momma's House (2000) (special makeup effects)
Bicentennial Man (1999) (special age makeup)
The Insider (1999) (special makeup artist: Russell Crowe)
Idle Hands (1999) (special makeup effects artist)
Blade (1998) (special makeup effects artist)
From the Earth to the Moon (1998) (mini) TV Series (special age makeup)
House of Frankenstein (1997) (TV) (special makeup effects creator)
a.k.a. House of Frankenstein 1997
Titanic (1997) (old Rose special effects makeup)
Kull the Conqueror (1997) (special makeup artist) (creature effects)
Steel (1997) (Steel's Suit Designer)
Thinner (1996) (special makeup effects)
a.k.a. Stephen King's Thinner
The Puppet Masters (1994) (special makeup effects)
a.k.a. Robert A. Heinlein's The Puppet Masters
The Mask (1994) (creator special makeup)
The Shadow (1994) (special makeup)
Mrs. Doubtfire (1993) (special makeup designer)
The Man Without a Face (1993) (special makeup creator)
Hoffa (1992) (special makeup designer)
Forever Young (1992) (special makeup)
Bram Stoker's Dracula (1992) (special makeup effects)
Batman Returns (1992) (special makeup effects artist) (designer: Penguin Hand) (uncredited)
Alien 3 (1992) (special makeup effects: Los Angeles)
Hook (1991) (special makeup)
Star Trek VI: The Undiscovered Country (1991) (special alien dog makeup)
Kickboxer 2: The Road Back (1991) (special makeup)
Highlander II: The Quickening (1991) (special makeup)
Highlander II: The Renegade Version (UK: director's cut) (US: video title (director's cut))
Subspecies (1991) (special makeup effects)
Postcards from the Edge (1990) (special makeup artist: Shirley Maclaine) (uncredited)
The Exorcist III (1990) (special makeup effects creator)
a.k.a. The Exorcist III: Legion
a.k.a. William Peter Blatty's The Exorcist III
Flatliners (1990) (special makeup effects artist) (uncredited)
Dick Tracy (1990) (special makeup application) (uncredited)
Tales from the Crypt (special effects makeup creator) (2 episodes, 1990) (special makeup artist) (2 episodes, 1989–1990)
Cyborg (1989) (special makeup)
Monsters (special makeup artist) (1 episode, 1989)
Fright Night Part 2 (1988) (special makeup creator: "Louie" and "Bocworth")
Big Top Pee-wee (1988) (special makeup)
The Lost Boys (1987) (special makeup effects)
Werewolf (1987) TV Series (special makeup)
A Nightmare on Elm Street 3: Dream Warriors (1987) (special makeup effects sequences)
a.k.a. A Nightmare on Elm Street Part III
Vamp (1986) (special makeup)
Amazing Stories (special makeup artist) (1 episode, 1985) (special makeup effects artist) (1 episode, 1985)
Cocoon (1985) (special makeup effects)
Dreamscape (1984) (special makeup)
Thriller (1983) (V) (special makeup effects artist)
a.k.a. Michael Jackson's Thriller (US: complete title)
The Sword and the Sorcerer (1982) (special makeup effects)
The Incredible Shrinking Woman (1981) (special makeup effects)
The Howling (1981) (special makeup effects artist)
It Lives Again (1978) (special makeup effects) (assistant to Rick Baker)
a.k.a. It's Alive II
The Fury (1978) (special makeup assistant)
Manbeast! Myth or Monster? (1978) (special makeup effects artist)
The Incredible Melting Man (1977) (special makeup assistant)
Hot Tomorrows (1977) (special makeup effects artist)

Awards and nominations

Major awards

Academy Awards

Primetime Emmy Awards

British Academy Film Awards

Saturn Awards

Make-Up Artists and Hair Stylists Guild Awards

See also
 Prosthetic makeup
 Special effect

References

External links
 

1951 births
Living people
American make-up artists
Special effects people
People from Washington, D.C.
Cypress College alumni
Best Makeup Academy Award winners
Academy Award for Technical Achievement winners